"Get Along with You" is a song by American singer Kelis from her debut studio album, Kaleidoscope (1999). A staccato, Pop and R&B ballad, "Get Along with You" describes how someone's love for and the need to "get along with" their love interest is more substantial than material possessions and even the world itself.

Released as the second single from Kaleidoscope in the US on April 10, 2000, "Get Along with You" was not a commercial success, failing to enter the US Billboard Hot 100. It was later released as the on third and final single in Europe in October 2000, peaking at number 51 on the UK Singles Chart.

Music video
The music video for "Get Along with You", directed by Paul Hunter, begins with Kelis, who is donning an all-black, gothic-like attire, standing in place. She proceeds to open her laced jacket to reveal a new "world" within herself. This "new world" shows Kelis standing in an empty street. She sings the first verse while flying around in a dark and gloomy city, as an orange gas comes out of her mouth every time she speaks. She then flies to a flower shop and looks inside where she sees dead flowers that quickly come back to life. After coming out of a well, Kelis walks in a heavily wooded area, filled with trees. She then stands upon a giant telescope. Kelis wanders aimlessly to a beach and sits holding a parasol, singing. The camera pans to Kelis' feet and she is shown flying over the ocean of which she was previously viewing with dolphins swimming beneath her. After entering another iron gate, Kelis is shown as a doll and begins to disassemble herself. A light begins to emit from her dismembered, clay body; the light begins to shine very brightly, illuminating the seas and the city within herself. In closing of the song, the camera pans out and Kelis closes the open "window" to her inner self.

The video premiered on BET the week ending on March 26, 2000.

Track listings
UK CD single
"Get Along with You" (Album Version) – 4:27
"Get Along with You" (DJ Dodge Soul Inside Radio Mix) – 3:58
"Get Along with You" (Bump & Flex Radio Edit) – 3:52
"Get Along with You" (Morales Radio Edit) – 3:46
"Get Along with You" (video)

European CD single
"Get Along with You" (Pharrell Edit Version) – 4:12
"Get Along with You" (Bump & Flex Club Mix) – 6:29

Charts

Release history

References

1990s ballads
1999 songs
2000 singles
Contemporary R&B ballads
Kelis songs
Music videos directed by Paul Hunter (director)
Song recordings produced by the Neptunes
Songs written by Chad Hugo
Songs written by Pharrell Williams